Desmond Buckingham (born 7 February 1985) is an English professional football manager who is the current head coach of Indian Super League club Mumbai City. 
 
Buckingham became the youngest head coach in the history of the A-League during the 2016–17 A-League season.

Playing career
Born in Oxford, England, Buckingham had spells in the youth and reserve teams of English sides Reading and Oxford United. A professional career did not materialise, and Buckingham subsequently joined Oxford & Cherwell Valley College in a full-time coaching and teaching role over a four-year period.

Coaching career

Oxford United

Buckingham began his professional coaching career at Oxford United at the age of 18, initially working through the club's age-group squads. At the start of the 2013–14 Football League Two season, Buckingham progressed as a coach into the first team, under then-manager, Chris Wilder. 
 
In his time at the club, Buckingham was able to support the transition of 24 players from the youth ranks into their first professional contracts.

Wellington Phoenix

Buckingham joined the Wellington Phoenix during the 2014–15 A-League season under head coach Ernie Merrick. On 1 January 2017, following the resignation of Merrick, he was appointed as manager until the end of the season. At 31 years of age, he became the youngest manager in A-League history and was able to lift the club off the bottom of the table, finishing one place outside the playoffs at the end of the season.

Stoke City

In July, 2017 Buckingham was granted permission to leave Wellington Phoenix and take up a role at then-Premier League club Stoke City as an assistant coach with their under-23 team.

New Zealand Football

A return to New Zealand in 2018 saw Buckingham appointed as head coach of the New Zealand U20 team and assistant manager of the senior national team. 
             
In August, 2018 Buckingham led the team to the 2018 OFC U-19 Championship, qualifying for the 2019 FIFA U-20 World Cup. At the World Cup, Buckingham's New Zealand side recorded their highest ever finish at a men's FIFA tournament, eventually being knocked out by Colombia in the round of 16 after a controversial penalty shoot-out. The team also posted New Zealand's biggest ever win at a FIFA tournament with a 5–0 win over Honduras, becoming the first New Zealand team to win back to back games at a FIFA event, the team also recorded their first ever win over European opposition with a 2–0 win over Norway. Buckingham earned plaudits for the team's quality of football and style of play. Former All Whites Ricki Herbert and Wynton Rufer praised the positive and attacking approach to winning games rarely seen before in New Zealand. 
 
Despite being linked to clubs in the English Football League and A-League, Buckingham accepted the New Zealand U23 managerial position in June 2019, leading the side into the 2019 Pacific Games and OFC Olympic Qualifying Tournament. Buckingham guided New Zealand to its first-ever gold medal at the 2019 Pacific Games, leading an U-23 side through an otherwise senior international competition undefeated. 
 
In September 2019, in the lead up to the OFC Olympic Qualifying Tournament the New Zealand U-23 side played out two draws against their Australian counterparts. 
 
On 5 October 2019, Buckingham led New Zealand to its third Olympic Games, qualifying for Tokyo 2020 by winning the OFC U-23 Championship. In doing so, the team became the most dominant men's side to have played in an Oceania Football Confederation competition by winning all five games and finishing with a goal difference of +29. The New Zealand U23 side remained unbeaten during his tenure, winning nine and drawing three of 12 games. 
 
New Zealand Football announced that Buckingham would leave his role as coach of the under-23 side in April 2020, despite a large group of players writing to the governing body to retain his services as coach. Buckingham's contract was not extended following delays caused by the COVID-19 pandemic and the postponement of the 2020 Summer Olympics and he was replaced by Danny Hay. 
 
Buckingham was named Men's Coach of the year at New Zealand Football Awards 2020.

Melbourne City

In September 2020, Buckingham joined A-League club Melbourne City as Assistant Coach after being identified by the City Football Group. He has managed the team on multiple occasions in the absence of Patrick Kisnorbo, when he has been injured or ill. 
 
In his first season, Melbourne City claimed their maiden A-League trophy in the teams eleven-year history, winning the league to secure the A-League Premiers Plate. The team completed the double a month later, winning their first A-League Grand Final.

Mumbai City

2021–22 season
On 8 October 2021, Buckingham was appointed as the head coach of Indian Super League club Mumbai City of the City Football Group on a two-year contract. Under his management, the club began its 2021–22 season campaign with a 3–0 win on 22 November against FC Goa. In Buckinghams first season in charge, Mumbai  City finished the season on fifth place, amassing 31 points from 20 games.  
 
Ahead of the 2022 AFC Champions League kick-off, the club travelled to Abu Dhabi for a training camp and defeated Emirati giants Al Ain 2–1 in a friendly match. 
 
On 11 April 2022, Buckingham led City to the Clubs first win at the AFC Champions League, becoming the first Indian team to win a game in the competition, beating Iraqi Premier League champions Al-Quwa Al-Jawiya 2–1 at the King Fahd International Stadium in Saudi Arabia.

Buckingham's side became the most successful Indian Club to compete in the AFC Champions League., finishing second in Group B, with results against Al-Jazira and Al-Zawraa adding to their second-round win. Mumbai City and Buckingham won praise for their fearless approach and positive playing style at the tournament.

2022–23 season
On 18 August 2022, under Buckingham, Mumbai City made their Durand Cup debut with a 4–1 win over Indian Navy. The team progressed to the knockout stages, finishing top of their five-team group that included Indian Super League clubs ATK Mohun Bagan and East Bengal. Mumbai City advanced through the quarter-final stage, beating Chennaiyin before securing a win over Mohammedan in the semi-finals to make their first ever Durand Cup Final. Mumbai City finished as runners-up in the tournament after a 2–1 loss to Bengaluru in the final on 18 September 2022.

On 8 January 2023, with a 4–0 home win over Kerala Blasters in the 2022–23 Indian Super League, Mumbai City created an 8 game record breaking winning streak. On 27 January, City made a 16 game record breaking unbeaten streak with a 2–1 away win against Jamshedpur.

Personal life 

Buckingham is a qualified pilot, and holds a Master's degree in advanced performance football coaching through the University of South Wales. 
 
He was inducted into the 2019 edition of the High Performance Sport New Zealand Coach Accelerator Programme, a three-year programme aimed at developing and increasing New Zealand's pool of world-class coaches.

Managerial statistics

Honours

New Zealand Football 
 OFC U-20 Championship: 2018 
 Pacific Games: 2019 
 OFC U-23 Championship 
 
Melbourne City  
 A-League Premiership: 2020–21 
 A-League Championship: 2021

Mumbai City
Indian Super League League Winners Shield: 2022–23
 Durand Cup runner-up: 2022
 
Individual  
 New Zealand Football Men's Coach of the Year: 2020

References

External links
Des Buckingham profile on Soccerway's website

Living people
Footballers from Oxford
English football managers
English expatriate sportspeople in New Zealand
Expatriate association football managers in New Zealand
A-League Men managers
Wellington Phoenix FC managers
1985 births
English expatriate football managers
Melbourne City FC non-playing staff
Oxford United F.C. non-playing staff
Association football coaches
Mumbai City FC managers
Association football goalkeepers
Association football players not categorized by nationality